The Parrott rifle was a type of muzzle-loading rifled artillery weapon used extensively in the American Civil War.

Parrott rifle
The gun was invented by Captain Robert Parker Parrott, a West Point graduate. He was an American soldier and inventor of military ordnance. He resigned from the service in 1836 and became the superintendent of the West Point Foundry in Cold Spring, New York. He created the first Parrott rifle (and corresponding projectile) in 1860 and patented it in 1861. Daniel Treadwell, who developed a method for making built-up guns in early 1840s, tried to claim that his patent infringed on an earlier one, but in 1866 S.D.N.Y. court dismissed it, deciding that Treadwell's claim was invalidated by a 1843 British patent to John Frith.

Parrotts were manufactured with a combination of cast and wrought iron. The cast iron made for an accurate gun, but was brittle enough to suffer fractures. Hence, a large wrought iron reinforcing band was overlaid on the breech to give it additional strength. There were earlier cannons designed this way, but the method of securing this band was the innovation that allowed the Parrott to overcome the deficiencies of these earlier models. It was applied to the gun red-hot and then the gun was turned while pouring water down the muzzle, allowing the band to attach uniformly. By the end of the Civil War, both sides were using this type of gun extensively.

Parrott rifles were manufactured in different sizes, from the 10-pounder Parrott rifle up to the rare 300-pounder. In the field, the 10- and 20-pounders were used by both armies. Confederate forces used both bore sizes during the war, which added to the complication of supplying  the appropriate ammunition to its batteries. Until 1864, Union batteries used only the 2.9-in. The M1863, with a 3-in bore, had firing characteristics similar to the earlier model; it can be recognized by its straight barrel, without muzzle-swell.

On June 23-24, 1862, President Abraham Lincoln made an unannounced visit to West Point, where he consulted with retired Gen. Winfield Scott regarding the handling of the Civil War and the staffing of the War Department. Following this meeting, President Lincoln visited the West Point Foundry at which the 100- and 200-pound Parrott cannons were successfully demonstrated in live firing.

Naval versions of the 20-, 30-, 60-, and 100-pound Parrotts were also used by the Union navy. The 100-pound naval Parrott could achieve a range of 6,900 yards (6,300 meters) at an elevation of 25 degrees, or fire an 80-pound shell 7,810 yards (7,140 m) at 30 degrees elevation.

Although accurate, as well as being cheaper and easier to make than most rifled artillery guns, the Parrott had a poor reputation for safety and they were shunned by many artillerists. 
At the end of 1862, Henry J. Hunt attempted to get the Parrott eliminated from the Army of the Potomac's inventory, preferring the 3-inch ordnance rifle. When the Parrott gun burst in battle, artillerists would chip out the jagged parts and continue firing. In 1889, The New York Times called on the Ordnance Bureau of the War Department to discontinue use of the Parrott gun altogether, following a series of mishaps at the West Point training grounds.

Several hundred Parrott gun tubes remain today, many adorning battlefield parks, county courthouses, and museums. The gun tubes made by Parrott's foundry are identifiable by the letters WPF (West Point Foundry), along with a date stamp between 1860 and 1889, found on the front face of the gun tube. The first production Parrott gun tube (serial number 1) still exists, and is preserved on a reproduction gun carriage in the center square of Hanover, Pennsylvania, as part of a display commemorating the Battle of Hanover. A list of many of the surviving tubes can be found at the National Register of Surviving Civil War Artillery.

The larger sizes of Parrott rifles (100-pdr and up) were deployed in coast defense from 1863 to 1900, when they were replaced by Endicott period forts and weapons. Along with Rodman guns, some were deployed shortly after the outbreak of the Spanish–American War in 1898 as a stopgap; it was feared the Spanish fleet would bombard the US East Coast.

The 300-pound solution
By summer 1863, Union forces became frustrated by the heavily fortified Confederate position at Fort Sumter, and brought to bear the  Parrott, along with several smaller cannons. In all, two 80-pounder Whitworths, nine 100-pounder Parrotts, six 200-pounder Parrotts, and a 300-pounder Parrott were deployed. It was widely believed in the north that a massive 10-in Parrott would finally break the previously impenetrable walls of the fort, which had become the symbol of stalwart steadfastness for the Confederacy.

The Washington Republican described the technical accomplishments of the 10-in Parrott:

The 3-3/4" bore 24-pound shot, with a muzzle velocity of 1,625 feet per second, strikes a target at 3,500 yards with a velocity of about 300 feet per second (this is almost beyond the range of the weapon). In contrast, the 10" bore 300-pound shot, with a muzzle velocity of 1,111 feet per second, strikes the target at the same range still moving at 700 feet per second, due to its much higher mass to drag ratio. The resulting huge difference in impact energy, 33,000 ft-lb for the 24 lb, and over 2,000,000 ft-lb for the 300 lb, means the penetrating energy of the larger shell is 20 times that of the smaller.

In terms of the ability to punch holes in fortifications, at that long range the light 24 lb shell would be expected to only breech a 6" thick brick wall.  In contrast,  the greater mass and retained velocity of the 300 lb shell would enable it to penetrate 6 to 7 feet of brick (given the quality of the material back then). The Union soldiers knew Fort Sumter's brick walls averaged about 5 feet thick, and thus recognized the potential for such a cannon to help them succeed in taking back their Fort.

Swamp Angel

A famous large  Parrott cannon, called the Swamp Angel, was used by federal Brigadier General Quincy Adams Gillmore to bombard Charleston, South Carolina. It was manned by the 11th Maine Volunteer Infantry Regiment.

On August 21, 1863 Gillmore sent Confederate general P. G. T. Beauregard an ultimatum to abandon heavily fortified positions at Morris Island or the city of Charleston would be shelled.  When the positions were not evacuated within a few hours, Gillmore ordered the Parrott rifle to fire on the city. Between August 22 and August 23, the Swamp Angel fired on the city 36 times (the gun burst on the 36th round), using many incendiary shells which caused little damage and few casualties. The battle was made more famous by Herman Melville's poem "The Swamp Angel".

After the war, a damaged Parrott rifle said to be the Swamp Angel was moved to Trenton, New Jersey, where it rests as a memorial today at Cadwalader Park.

Parrott rifles by size

(*) This time is an educated guess, the time is unknown.
Flight times appear to be extremely inaccurate. Example: 10-in (300-lb) projectile would have to average only 133 ft per second to be in flight for 202 seconds to cover 9,000yds. A more accurate estimate will be in the range of 30 seconds.

See also
 Field artillery in the American Civil War
 Siege artillery in the American Civil War
 Civil War Defenses of Washington
 Rodman gun
 Seacoast defense in the United States
Contemporary rifled artillery
James rifle
Sawyer rifle
Brooke rifle
Wiard rifle

References

Further reading
 United States War Department. Atlas to Accompany the Official Records of the Union and Confederate Armies. Washington, D.C.: Government Printing Office, 1880–1901.
 Thomas, Dean, Cannons: An Introduction to Civil War Artillery, Thomas Publications, Gettysburg, 1985
 James Hazlett, Edwin Olmstead, & M. Hume Parks, Field Artillery Weapons of the Civil War, University of Delaware Press, Newark, 1983
 Johnson, Curt, and Richard C. Anderson, Artillery Hell: Employment of Artillery at Antietam, College Station, TX: Texas A&M University Press, 1995
 Coggins, Jack, Arms and Equipment of the Civil War. Wilmington N.C.: Broadfoot Publishing Company, 1989. (Originally published 1962).

External links

 10 pdr. Parrott Rifle at the Civil War Artillery Compendium
 Full Profile of the 10 pdr. Parrott Rifle
 Full Profile of the 20 pdr. Parrott Rifle
 Profile and Photos of The Swamp Angel
 The Civil War Artillery Page
 Civil War Artillery Projectiles

Field artillery
American Civil War artillery
Naval guns of the United States
Coastal artillery
Hanover, Pennsylvania
Large-calibre artillery